Kathy Jamieson  (born 15 January 1957 in Burnley, Lancashire, England) is an English actress. Her first notable TV appearance was as Maggie Brady in educational historical drama How We Used To Live. She has appeared in British films including Business as Usual (1987) and Butterfly Kiss (1995). In her 2001–2002 role in BBC Police drama Merseybeat, she played Dawn, the wife of Inspector Jim Oulton, in turn played by her actual husband John McArdle.

Jamieson has also appeared in Emmerdale, Coronation Street, Heartbeat and Cracker.

References

External links 

TV.com profile

1957 births
Living people
People from Burnley
Actresses from Lancashire
English television actresses
English soap opera actresses